The Stanley Theater is a former movie theater located in Newark, New Jersey. It was built in 1927 and was turned into a social hall in the 1970s. It was added to the National Register of Historic Places on August 28, 1986.

Description
This Spanish Atmospheric style theater was named for the Warner Brothers-owned circuit that built it. Frank Grad was the architect, with interior decoration by Landish Studios. The Stanley Theater first opened in 1927, but due to its location in the outskirts of Newark, it ran second-run to the circuit's downtown Branford Theater.

By the early 1970s, the Stanley Theater was no longer profitable and got sold to an Italian-American cultural organization that turned it into a social hall called Casa Italiana. The Atmospheric style decor was retained, but the single floor auditorium was cleared of seats so it could be used for dining and dancing.

Since 1980 it has been Newark Tabernacle.

See also
National Register of Historic Places listings in Essex County, New Jersey
Newark Symphony Hall
Stanley Theater (Jersey City)
McDonald's Gospelfest

References

Theatres completed in 1927
Culture of Newark, New Jersey
Buildings and structures in Newark, New Jersey
National Register of Historic Places in Newark, New Jersey
New Jersey Register of Historic Places